Dytilaos, was a Tetrarch of the Tectosagii in the 1st century BC. He was the father of Amyntas, Tetrarch of the Tectosagii and King of Cilicia Trachae.

References
 Christian Settipani, Les Ancêtres de Charlemagne (France: Éditions Christian, 1989).

People from ancient Cilicia